The Tianjin Lions or Tianjing Fierce Lions (天津雄狮) are a team in the China Baseball League, founded in 2002 as one of the league's four initial members. Their home field is the 2,000-capacity Tian Ti Dodger Stadium in Tianjin.

The Lions have participated in every league championship series to date. They won league championships in 2002, 2006, 2007, and 2011; and were runners-up in 2003, 2004, and 2005. Their biggest rival is the Beijing Tigers, having faced them in six CBL championships. They also represented CBL in the 2008 Asia Series.

Notable players
 Zhao Quansheng, P
 Zhang Zhenwang, C (signed with the New York Yankees, June 18, 2007)
 Wang Jingchao, SS
 Yang Guogang, 3B
 Yi Jiao, Coach

References

Baseball in China
Sport in Tianjin